Gerald Brian Sly (born 21 October 1932) is a former English cricketer.  Sly was a right-handed batsman who bowled right-arm fast-medium.  He was born at Ealing, Middlesex.

Sly made a single first-class appearance for Sussex against Oxford University at the County Ground, Hove in 1953.  He didn't bat in this match, but did take the wicket of Colin Cowdrey in Oxford University's first-innings.  The match ended in a draw.  This was his only major appearance for Sussex.

References

External links
Gerald Sly at ESPNcricinfo
Gerald Sly at CricketArchive

1932 births
Living people
People from Ealing
English cricketers
Sussex cricketers